The Church of the Monastery of San Miguel de Bárcena is a church located in Bárcena del Monasterio, Tineo, Asturias, Spain.

The current building, formerly the church of the Monastery of San Miguel de Bárcena, dates from the 13th century.  A 16th-century chapel is located on the building's north side. There is a vestry and small domed apsidioles. Part of the building contains Romanesque architecture, and another Pre-Romanesque. Its foundation is a reconstruction of an existing old building. The interior is decorated with wall paintings from the 16th century.

A stone funerary inscription dates to the year 1003.

See also
Asturian art
Catholic Church in Spain

References

Churches in Asturias
Miguel de Barcena
Bien de Interés Cultural landmarks in Asturias